Tamprusi is a Gur language of Ghana.

Names 
The general and accepted name for the language is Tampulma. The name Tamprusi Is mostly used to refer to the ethnic group who speak the language, and it is unaccepted by native speakers to refer to the language.

Geographic distribution 
The Tampulma language is the language of the Tamprusi people. The Tamprusi are located in the Northern Region, especially in the North Gonja District, dominated by the Gonja people and in the Mamprusi District, dominated by the Mamprusi people.

The Dagomba people are also present and dominant in the Region.

Classification 
The Tampulma language is one of the Gurunsi languages. It is related to the languages of Dega, Sisaala and Vagla.

The Gurunsi languages are Gur languages, which are Niger–Congo languages.

Mampruli, another Gur language, and Gonja, which is a Kwa language, are the dominant languages in this areas. Also, Dagbani, related to Mampruli, is also a dominant language all over the area.

The Tamprussi also speak English, French and Hausa.

In a similar way as in other African languages, Tampulma has a Nown class sistem. For example, Tampulma is a component of Tamp- and -ulma, similar to Kiswahili, which is composed of Ki- and -swahili.

See also
 Tammari language
 Mamprusi language
 Kusasi language

References

Languages of Ghana
Gurunsi languages